Interstate 165 (I-165) is a  auxiliary Interstate Highway in the US state of Kentucky. A spur route of I-65, it extends from I-65 in Bowling Green to U.S. Route 60 (US 60) and US 231 in Owensboro. It opened in 1972 as the Green River Parkway and was renamed the William H. Natcher Parkway in 1994. It was designated as I-165 in 2019 after completion of a project that brought the highway up to Interstate Highway standards.

Route description

The Interstate Highway begins at a cloverleaf interchange with I-65 (exit 20) near Bowling Green. The portion of the former William H. Natcher Parkway between US 231 and I-65 is not a part of the Interstate Highway System as per federal regulations and is designated as Kentucky Route 9007 (KY 9007). I-165 travels along the west side of the city in a northwesterly direction through rolling farmlands and near coal mines for  before meeting its northern terminus at an interchange with US 60 in Owensboro. At exit 41, the freeway intersects with the Wendell H. Ford Western Kentucky Parkway. I-165 bypasses the cities of Morgantown, Beaver Dam, and Hartford.

History

The highway that is now I-165 opened in 1972 as the Green River Parkway and later became the William H. Natcher Parkway before receiving the I-165 designation. In early 2016, funding was set aside to rebuild and restore sections of the parkway to Interstate standards. From July to August 2017, construction consisting of shoulder widening, draining, and repaving was completed. Additional work is underway along the entirety of the parkway. In July 2018, major modernization upgrades began in the Warren County section, consisting of ramp extensions, guardrail replacement, LED lighting updates, and bridge wall replacement. This work continued through the end of 2018. The US 231 interchange is currently under reconstruction, with it being converted from a standard cloverleaf to a parclo AB2, or folded diamond, interchange. A new interchange may be constructed between the milemarkers 3.4 and 4, allowing access to Elrod Road in Bowling Green.

The presumed number for the parkway was I-565, but, on September 24, 2017, the American Association of State Highway and Transportation Officials (AASHTO)'s Special Committee on U.S. Route Numbering approved the Natcher Parkway as I-165 instead.

On September 5, 2018, it was announced that the entire parkway would be signed with I-165 shields by the end of 2019, even before completion of the parkway's upgrades, thus officially bringing it to Interstate status. On March 6, 2019, the resigning of the freeway began, thus officially designating it as I-165, with exit numbers reverting to the parkway's original exit numbers prior to its extension to US 231 in November 2011. In 2018, Representative Suzanne Miles of Owensboro introduced a bill that would have given the highway an honorary designation of "William H. Natcher Expressway", but the bill did not make it out of committee.

Exit list

See also

References

External links

KentuckyRoads.com — William H. Natcher Parkway
Exit Guide for Natcher Parkway

65-1
Transportation in Butler County, Kentucky
Transportation in Daviess County, Kentucky
Transportation in Ohio County, Kentucky
Transportation in Warren County, Kentucky
1 (Kentucky)